The Football League 2007–08 (named Coca-Cola Football League for sponsorship reasons), was the sixteenth season under its current league division format. It began in August 2007 and concluded in May 2008, with the promotion play-off finals.

The Football League is contested through three Divisions. The second division of these is League One. The winner and the runner up of League One will be automatically promoted to the Football League Championship and they will be joined by the winner of the League One playoff. The bottom four teams in the league will be relegated to the third division, League Two.

Leeds United played at this level for the first time in their history having spent all their time in the top two divisions.

Changes from last season

From League One
Promoted to Championship
 Scunthorpe United
 Bristol City
 Blackpool

Relegated to League Two
 Chesterfield
 Bradford City
 Rotherham United
 Brentford

To League One
Relegated from Championship
 Southend United
 Luton Town
 Leeds United

Promoted from League Two
 Walsall
 Hartlepool United
 Swindon Town
 Bristol Rovers

League table

Play-offs

League One

Top scorers

Key events
 On 4 August 2007, Leeds United are docked 15 points at start of the season for entering administration.
 On 22 November 2007, Luton Town were docked 10 points for being placed into administration after directors of the club decided to appoint administrators as a result of their loss of income.
 On 8 February 2008, AFC Bournemouth went to administration and were docked 10 points by the Football League with debts around £4 million.

Managers

Stadia and locations

Managerial changes

References

External links 
The Football League

 
EFL League One seasons
2007–08 Football League
3
Eng